Minä ja pojat is the fourth album by Finnish rock group Ismo Alanko Säätiö, released in 2004.

Track listing 
Music and lyrics by Ismo Alanko, unless where noted.
"Lumous katoaa" (Karjalainen) -- 3:50
"Rakkaus hallitsee"—3:44
"Silloin kun taivas vielä auttoi meitä"—3:47
"Ruuvaa, väännä, säädä, hinkkaa"—3:46
"Pentti"—3:47
"Isä ja lapsi"—3:53
"Joensuu" (Alanko, Kämäräinen, Karjalainen) -- 5:03
"Liikaa"—3:28
"Pakko tehdä duunii"—3:44
"Minä ja pojat"—2:43
"Kaikki raitistuu"—3:17

Personnel 
Riku Mattila—guitar
Ismo Alanko -- vocals, guitar
Marko Timonen -- drums, percussion
Jarno Karjalainen -- bass, vocals
Timo Kämäräinen—guitar, vocals

2004 albums
Ismo Alanko Säätiö albums